is a Japanese manga series by Mengo Yokoyari. It was serialized in Square Enix's seinen manga magazine Big Gangan from September 2012 to March 2017, and has been collected in eight tankōbon volumes. Both an anime television series adaptation by Lerche and live-action television series aired between January and March 2017 on Fuji TV.

Plot
High school student Hanabi Yasuraoka has been in love with Narumi Kanai, her older childhood friend who is now her homeroom teacher. But from the look in Narumi's eyes when he sees the new music teacher Akane Minagawa, Hanabi realizes that he is in love with Akane and not her. Hanabi meets Mugi Awaya, another student who is in love with Akane, who was his tutor when he was in middle school. Hanabi and Mugi make a pact and begin a fake relationship to satisfy each other's loneliness from their respective unrequited loves, both sexually and emotionally. They agree to not fall in love with each other and end the relationship if their love is returned from the people they are in love with.

Characters

Main characters

 Played by: Miyu Yoshimoto
 A high school student who is in love with Narumi. After finding out that Narumi is in love with Akane, Hanabi begins a fake relationship with Mugi to satisfy their mutual loneliness. She later enters into a physical relationship with her best friend Sanae, but the relationship ends after Sanae decides to give up on Hanabi. Hanabi then decides to quit her fake relationship with Mugi and goes on a different path to find her true love. In Decor, Hanabi hasn't moved on from her feelings of Mugi—despite being with lots of friends during their time apart—she still loves him. While working as a staff member at a concert venue, she sees Mugi again and the two of them accept each other's love and hold hands, possibly starting the genuine relationship the both of them had hoped for.

 Played by: Dori Sakurada
 A high school student who is in love with Akane. He and Hanabi begin a fake relationship to satisfy each other's desires. In middle school, Mugi had already been in a secret relationship with his senior, Mei Hayakawa, who took his virginity since he was not able to confess his love to Akane. Mugi had always been aware of what kind of person Akane is, but loved her nevertheless. Later in the series, Mugi confesses to Akane and they go on a date. However, after the date, Mugi realizes that he cannot hold on to his ideal image of Akane he had and bids farewell to Akane with the hopes that he can finally move on from her. Later on, he's shown to have moved on after coming to a conclusion to end everything with Hanabi in order to pursue a better life and find true love. In Decor, Mugi still hasn't gotten over Hanabi despite having a multitude of sexual encounters with different women over the course of their time apart. Eventually, while daydreaming about Hanabi, he declines an invitation to have sex from a woman who approached him at his job, where he comes to the conclusion that Hanabi is the girl he wants. When he finally sees Hanabi again at a concert, he asks God to please let his relationship with her last this time and the two of them hold hands, possibly signifying that the two of them will start the relationship they had wanted.

 Played by: Kouki Mizuta
 Hanabi's older childhood friend and neighbor who becomes her homeroom teacher in high school. His mother died when he was young, so he usually went to Hanabi's home for homemade meals. He is attracted to women with long hair, as they remind him of his mother. Even after knowing Akane's true nature, Narumi does not seem to mind and asks her to marry him, which she accepts.

 Played by: Rina Aizawa
 A new music teacher who arrives at the school during Hanabi's freshman year. On the outside, she is a nice, well-behaved woman who is adored by her students, but she actually loves the feeling of winning a man's heart while directly hurting someone else who is in love with that man. She can also be considered a lonely person and a nymphomaniac. She attempts to seduce Narumi like her previous relationships, but she notices that Narumi refrains from touching her, unlike the men in her past, later realizing that he loves her. After Narumi asks her to marry him despite knowing her true nature, Akane begins to take interest in him.

 Played by: Sarii Ikegami
 Hanabi's friend and classmate. Sanae has been in love with Hanabi since she saved Sanae from a train molester. When Sanae has a sleepover at Hanabi's house, she impulsively kisses her and confesses her love in the process. The two then begin a physical relationship. Atsuya then questions Sanae on whether she is actually in love with Hanabi or just sexually attracted to her. After consideration, Sanae then gives up on Hanabi and attempts to end their friendship, although Hanabi refuses and says she wants to keep their friendship and will give Sanae space and time until she is ready to be friends again. Sanae later tells Atsuya that while she loves Hanabi, she is giving up on her and will start to trust him more. Later on, it is shown that Hanabi and Sanae reunite and get back to being mutual friends. Although the end of the original manga subtly hints that she may return the feelings of Atsuya someday, in Decor she has fully realized her homosexuality and begins a relationship with her university teacher Yuka.

Played by: Shiho
 Mugi's childhood friend who has been in love with him ever since someone told her that she and Mugi looked like a "prince" and "princess". She has been pursuing Mugi and trying to act and look like a princess because of the comment. She hates her own name and prefers to be called "Moka," abbreviated from "most kawaii." When she confesses her feelings to Mugi, Mugi takes advantage of her to pursue a physical relationship without returning her feelings. However, Mugi later realizes that Moka is special to him and he does not want to ruin her for his selfish needs; thus, their relationship ends.

Others

Played by: Takuya Negishi
Sanae's cousin who has romantic feelings for her. He questions Sanae about her relationship with Hanabi, asking her if she is really in love with Hanabi or is only sexually attracted to her. After Sanae decides to give up on Hanabi, she tells Atsuya that she will trust him more. In Decor, he again confesses his love for her after graduation and promises to be her support even if she rejects him, which makes Sanae depressed, since she highly appreciates his support, but can not reciprocate because of her lesbian orientation.

Played by: Shiori Yoshida
Mugi's senior at middle school. Mugi turned to her after being unable to initially confess to Akane and they had sex. Afterwards, Mei apologizes to Mugi for rushing him into having sex.

Played by: Hiroki Ino
One of Akane's former students who is in a physical relationship with her. Hanabi approaches him in an attempt to make Akane jealous, but she realizes that she is unable to repeat Akane's behavior.

Media

Manga
Scum's Wish, written and illustrated by Mengo Yokoyari began in Square Enix's Big Gangan magazine on September 25, 2012, and finished on March 25, 2017. That same day Square Enix simultaneously released the eighth and final tankōbon in a regular and a limited first edition.

The series is published digitally in English by Crunchyroll Manga and in print by Yen Press.

A spin-off manga titled Kuzu no Honkai décor ran in Big Gangan from November 25, 2017 to May 25, 2018. It was collected into one volume.

Volume list

Volume 7.5, a fan book titled Ambivalent, covering the manga and the anime, was released by Square Enix on December 24, 2016.

Anime
An anime television series adaptation was announced in March 2016 to air on Fuji TV's Noitamina block beginning on January 12 and concluded on March 30, 2017. It was streamed exclusively by Amazon Prime Video in Japan and worldwide. The series is directed by Masaomi Andō and is animated at the studio Lerche with series composition by Makoto Uezu, character designs by Keiko Kurosawa and music by Masaru Yokoyama. The series ran for 12 episodes released across six Blu-ray/DVD volumes. The opening song is titled  and is sung by 96neko (who later voiced Anne Faulkner in Paradox Live). The ending theme titled  is sung by Sayuri. The anime has been licensed by Sentai Filmworks for digital and home video release. Madman Entertainment released the series on home video in Australia and New Zealand. MVM Entertainment acquired the series for home video in the United Kingdom and Ireland.

Episode list

Live-action TV
A live-action TV series adaptation was announced in December 2016 and aired in twelve episodes on Fuji TV between January 18 and April 5, 2017.

Reception
The manga had 1.9 million copies in print .

The series ranked eleventh in the first Next Manga Award in the print manga category.

References

External links
 
Official TV drama website 

2017 anime television series debuts
Anime Strike
Anime series based on manga
Aniplex
Drama anime and manga
Gangan Comics manga
Lerche (studio)
Noitamina
Psychological anime and manga
Romance anime and manga
Seinen manga
Sentai Filmworks
Television shows written by Makoto Uezu
Works banned in China
Yen Press titles
LGBT in anime and manga